Gaspard, marquis de Cherville (1819 Chartres - 1898), was a French author.

Career
For some time he collaborated with the elder Dumas. Subsequently he became known as a writer on the chase, angling, and animal life.

Works
From the list of his independent works may be cited:
 Les aventures d'un chien-de-chasse (“Adventures of a hunting dog,” 1862; 2d ed. 1882)
 Histoire d'un trop bon chien (“Story of a very good dog,” 1867; an illustrated ed. 1884)
 Les éléphants (“Elephants,” 1895)

References

1819 births
1898 deaths
French non-fiction outdoors writers